The mixed 4 × 100 metre medley relay competition of the swimming events at the 2019 Pan American Games are scheduled to be held August 8, 2019 at the Villa Deportiva Nacional Videna cluster.

The United States team originally won the gold medal, however it was disqualified for two alleged breaststroke kicks off the turn. USA Swimming voiced their disagreement with the decision, but they were not allowed to appeal.

Records
Prior to this competition, the existing World Record was as follows:

Results

Heats
The first round was held on August 8.

Final
The final round was also held on August 8.

References

Swimming at the 2019 Pan American Games
Panamerican